Amy Miles is an American recording artist and performer. She has recorded three solo albums and is also a member of the band Baby, a performer with The Loser's Lounge and Citizens Band,  which also includes Rain Phoenix, Nina Persson, Ian Buchanan, and Karen Elson. Miles co-created and produced the Soundtracks Live at the UCB Theatre. Miles is also working with Amy Poehler on the digital TV show, Smart Girls at the Party.

In 2005, Miles performed the song "Heavy Packer" from the album Noble Hatch on Jimmy Kimmel Live!. She also performed the theme song with Michael Robertson for the opening sequence of the Nickelodeon show, The Mighty B!, who Poehler created and voiced the title character.

In 2008, she starred on PBS's Lomax show.

Discography
2002: Dirty Stay Out
2005: Noble Hatch
2010: King of Girls
2015: Ready Let's Go!

External links
 
 

Year of birth missing (living people)
Living people
American women pop singers
American multi-instrumentalists
Musicians from Arkansas
People from Conway, Arkansas
21st-century American women